Tân Tiến is a ward located in Biên Hòa city of Đồng Nai province, Vietnam. It has an area of about 1.3km2 and the population in 2018 was 18,286.

References

Bien Hoa